Bedford Township is an inactive township in Lincoln County, in the U.S. state of Missouri.

It is unclear why the name Bedford was applied to this township.

References

Townships in Missouri
Townships in Lincoln County, Missouri